José García López (3 May 1902 – 10 August 1982), better known as José Nieto, was a Spanish actor. He appeared in more than one hundred films from 1925 to 1983.

Filmography

References

External links 
 

1902 births
1982 deaths
Spanish male film actors
Spanish male silent film actors
People from Murcia
20th-century Spanish male actors